Joaquima is a genus of moths belonging to the family Tortricidae.

Species
Joaquima tricolora Razowski & Becker, 1999

See also
List of Tortricidae genera

References

 , 1999, Polskie Pismo Ent. 68: 411.
 , 2005, World Catalogue of Insects 5

External links

tortricidae.com

Euliini
Tortricidae genera